Lavinia Stan (born 1966 in Pitești, Romania) is a professor of political science at St. Francis Xavier University in Canada. She  currently lives in Montreal.

Education and career 
After obtaining a degree from the Bucharest Academy of Economic Studies, 
she emigrated to Canada in 1991. She then earned a Ph.D. in Political Science from the University of Toronto. Between 2001 and 2003 she taught at Dalhousie University in Halifax, while from 2006 to 2008 she taught at Concordia University in Montreal. Since 2004, Stan has been a Professor of Political Science at St. Francis Xavier university in Nova Scotia.

Stan served as Vice-President and then President of the Society for Romanian Studies, the premier international organization on Romanian Studies, in 2010-2014 and 2014-2019, respectively, in which capacity she launched two key publication venues in the field of Romanian Studies: a book series sponsored jointly by the SRS and the largest academic publisher in Romania, Polirom, and the peer-reviewed Journal of Romanian Studies. Stan was also a member of the Scientific Committee of the Institute for the Investigation of Communist Crimes and the Memory of Romanian Exile in Bucharest (2010-2012), and a member of the editorial or advisory boards of some twenty scholarly journals published in North America and Europe, including Human Rights Review. She has been a member of the Club of Rome since 2009, and Associate Editor of peer-reviewed Women's Studies International Forum and East European Politics and Societies. Stan has been an expert witness in a number of cases on deportation and asylum, as well as property restitution and corruption, in American and British courts.

Publications 
Lavinia Stan's publications have dealt with three major themes: transitional justice, religion and politics, and democratization broadly conceived, with a focus on post-communist Eastern Europe. She is renowned for her work on religion and politics in post-communist Romania, which argues that the majority Orthodox Church must be reigned in, if democracy is to be consolidated. Her work on transitional justice in post-communist countries has also gained wide recognition for her attention to the way in which civil society actors, even "political entrepreneurs" working in isolation from others, can advance reckoning in countries where state actors are unwilling to do so. Stan is one of the foremost scholars in Romanian Studies, having helped consolidate the field internationally.

She has authored, co-authored or edited the following volumes:

Transitional Justice
Transitional Justice and the Former Soviet Union: Reviewing the Past, Looking toward the Future. Cambridge university Press, 2018. . Co-edited with Cynthia M. Horne.
Post-Communist Transitional Justice: Lessons from Twenty-Five Years of Experience. Cambridge University Press, 2015. . Co-edited with Nadya Nedelsky.
Encyclopedia of Transitional Justice. Cambridge University Press, 2013. . Co-edited with Nadya Nedelsky.
Transitional Justice in Post-Communist Romania: The Politics of Memory. Cambridge University Press, 2013. .
Transitional Justice in Eastern Europe and the Former Soviet Union: Reckoning with the Communist Past. Routledge, 2009. . Romanian translation: Prezentul trecutului recent: Lustrație și decomunizare în postcomunism. Bucharest: Curtea Veche, 2010. .

Religion and Politics
Churches, Memory and Justice in Post-Communism. Springer, 2021. . Co-edited with L. Turcescu.
Church Reckoning with Communism in Post-1989 Romania. Rowman & Littlefield, 2021. . Co-edited with L. Turcescu.
Justice, Memory and Redress in Romania: New Insights. Cambridge Scholars, 2017. . Co-edited with L. Turcescu.
Church, State and Democracy in Expanding Europe. Oxford University Press, 2011. . Co-authored with L. Turcescu.
Religion and Politics in Post-communist Romania. Oxford University Press, 2007. . Romanian translation: Religie si politica in Romania postcomunista. Bucharest: Curtea Veche, 2010. . Co-authored with L. Turcescu.

Democratization
Post-Communist Romania at 35: Civic and Uncivic Values and Institutions. Rowman & Littlefield, 2015. . Co-edited with Diane Vancea.
1989-2009: Incredibila aventura a democratiei dupa comunism (interviews with Western and Romanian specialists on Eastern Europe on the occasion of 20 years since the collapse of communism). Iasi, Romania: Editura Institutul European, 2010. .
Leaders and Laggards: Governance, Civicness and Ethnicity in Post-Communist Romania. Columbia University Press, 2003. .
Romania in Transition. Dartmouth Press, 1997. .

In addition, Stan translated into Romanian two volumes:
Etienne de la Boetie, De la Servitude Volontaire, trans. with Sabina Elena Stan. Bucharest: Universal Dalsi Press, 1994.
Carl Schmidt, Political Theology, trans. with Lucian Turcescu, Bucharest: Universal Dalsi Press, 1995.

From 1997-2003 she published the quarterly report on the Republic of Moldova in East European Constitutional Review, while since 2006 she has co-authored the annual report regarding political developments in Romania for European Journal of Political Research.

References

External links
Faculty website at St. Francis Xavier University
Personal blog
Academia.edu page of Lavinia Stan
Getcited.org page of Lavinia Stan 

Living people
People from Pitești
1966 births
Canadian political scientists
Romanian political scientists
Romanian emigrants to Canada
Women political scientists
University of Toronto alumni
Academic staff of St. Francis Xavier University
Academic staff of the Dalhousie University
Academic staff of Concordia University
Bucharest Academy of Economic Studies alumni